The 1900 Westchester County tornado was an intense, but short-lived tornado that caused significant damage near the city of New Rochelle, New York.

Synopsis
The thunderstorm that produced the tornado tracked slightly north of due west through the area and was followed by a second strong thunderstorm that tracked northeastward. Intense lightning was associated with the two storms, resulting in several fires.

Impact
Throughout the city, trees were snapped and defoliated, signs were torn from the ground and tossed around and numerous buildings were damaged or destroyed. Airborne debris shattered windows in a large number of structures. In addition to the tornado, intense lightning was observed, many of which struck buildings, igniting fires. Two buildings were destroyed in the fires caused by the storm. The most significant fire took place on the Livingston Disbrow estate where the barns were struck. By the time they arrived on scene, the barn was completely ablaze and threatening to ignite the nearby carriage house where Mrs. Charles Disbrow was. While attending to the Disbrow fire, a second alarm was relayed to the firefighters about another house fire on the other side of the city. Two of the firemen who didn't attend the Disbrow fire gathered volunteers to put out the new fire. However, by the time they reached the building, it had been completely destroyed by the fire. The firefighters later reported that there would have been very little they could have done to save the building had they arrived before it burned to the ground as there was no nearby hydrant. Another lightning strike blew the chimney clear off one home and damaged the roof. The City Bank Building in New Rochelle was struck and caught fire; however, a janitor at the building was able to put out the fire. The final notable lightning strike hit a trolley car near an electrical pole, the lightning jumped from the car to the pole and killed a dog standing at the pole. At the Disbrow estate, losses were reported to be up to $15,000 (1900 USD). High winds caught people walking in the streets off-guard, knocking several down and pelting many with debris; none of the injuries were reported to be serious.

See also
List of North American tornadoes and tornado outbreaks
2006 Westchester County tornado

References

Tornadoes in New York (state)
1900 meteorology
Westchester County tornado
1900 natural disasters in the United States
August 1900 events
Tornadoes of 1900